The  Calabar Monorail  is a 12-car monorail system established in Calabar, state capital of Cross River state, Nigeria. The Calabar Monorail system was established so as to aid the movement and transportation of people from regions in Calabar, like from the Tinapa Resort down to the Calabar international conference center. The project which was initiated by the former governor of Cross River state, Senator Liyel Imoke is now continued by the current governor, Benedict Ayade which has now made it result to Calabar Monorail we have today.

Facilities 
The Calabar Monorail was built with some facilities, some of which include the Ponet TFZE together with 12 cars, 10 of which are for passengers and two being used as equipment cars.

After successful trials of the Calabar Monorail, the governor of Cross Rivers state, Benedict Ayade disclosed that there were plans to extend the monorail up to the Margaret Ekpo International Airport in Calabar.

Inauguration 
The Multi-million naira Calabar Monorail project was inaugurated by the Executive President of Nigeria, Muhammadu Buhari and this was also to mark a year in office for the governor of Cross Rivers state, Benedict Ayade.

See also 
 List of monorail systems

References

Proposed monorails
Proposed transport infrastructure in Nigeria